Simon V may refer to:

 Simon de Montfort, 5th Earl of Leicester ( – 1218)
 Simon de Montfort, 6th Earl of Leicester ( - 1265)
 Simon V, Count of Lippe (1511–1536)